Polch is a town in the district Mayen-Koblenz, Rhineland-Palatinate, Germany. It is part of the Verbandsgemeinde ("collective municipality") of Maifeld. It is situated east of Mayen.

Polch is twinned with the commune of Vineuil, located near Blois, Centre-Val de Loire, France

Local council (Stadtrat)
Elections were held in May 2014:

 FWG = Freie Wählergruppe Polch e.V.

References

Mayen-Koblenz